The Employment Equality (Age) Regulations 2006 (SI 2006/2408) is a piece of secondary legislation in the United Kingdom, which prohibits employers unreasonably discriminating against employees on grounds of age. It came into force on 1 October 2006. It is now superseded by the Equality Act 2010.

Outline
The Regulations follow a very similar structure to existing legislation concerning sex, race, and religion. They provide a broad justification defence and a wide range of exceptions which have been criticised for undermining the concept of discrimination law by providing too many compromises on what would otherwise be unlawful.

Default Retirement Age
Significant issues addressed by the legislation include the provision of a national default retirement age set at 65 (to be retained for at least 5 years) and the ability for employees to request work beyond the retirement age following procedure in schedule 6 of the Regulations.

A legal challenge to the Default Retirement Age ("DRA") brought by the charity Age UK failed in September 2009, with the judge finding that the Regulations did not breach the European Union's Equal Treatment at Work Directive.

The Coalition government announced in July 2010 that it intends to eliminate the DRA from October 2011. Compulsory retirement at age 65 was fully abolished in 2011.

See also
Ageism
Employment equality law in the United Kingdom
Employment Equality Regulations
UK labour law
Pensions in the United Kingdom
Age Discrimination in Employment Act and Age Discrimination Act of 1975 for the US

References

External links
Employment Equality (Age) Regulations 2006

Ageism
United Kingdom labour law
Anti-discrimination law in the United Kingdom
2006 in British law
Retirement in the United Kingdom
Statutory Instruments of the United Kingdom
2006 in labor relations
Old age in the United Kingdom